Birkhoff's theorem may refer to several theorems named for the American mathematician George David Birkhoff:

 Birkhoff's theorem (relativity)
 Birkhoff's theorem (electromagnetism)
 Birkhoff's ergodic theorem

It may also refer to theorems named for his son, Garrett Birkhoff:

Birkhoff–von Neumann theorem for doubly stochastic matrices
 Birkhoff's HSP theorem, concerning the closure operations of homomorphism, subalgebra and product
 Birkhoff's representation theorem for distributive lattices
 Birkhoff's theorem (equational logic), stating that syntactic and semantic consequence coincide